The Prestatyn Coal Company was formed in 1865, by Lord Mostyn, owner of Mostyn Colliery, to investigate the possibility of a colliery at Point of Ayr, in Flintshire, Wales.

Trial borings proved successful but the project was abandoned before work could properly begin.

References

Coal companies of Wales
Flintshire
British companies established in 1865
Energy companies established in 1865
1865 establishments in Wales